Mervyn Bishop (born July 1945) is an Australian news and documentary photographer. Joining The Sydney Morning Herald as a cadet in 1962 he was the first Aboriginal Australian to work on a metropolitan daily newspaper and one of the first to become a professional photographer. In 1971, four years after completing his cadetship, he was named Australian Press Photographer of the Year. He has continued to work as a photographer and lecturer.

Early life
Mervyn Bishop, a Murri man, was born in July 1945 in Brewarrina in north-west New South Wales. His father, "Minty" Bishop, had been a soldier and shearer, and was himself born to an Aboriginal mother and a Punjabi Indian father. In 1950, "Minty" gained an "official exemption certificate which permitted 'more advanced' Aborigines to live apart from mission blackfellas in post-war Australia". This enabled the family to live among "ordinary" people in Brewarrina. The catch to this certificate was that the exempt Aboriginal people were expected to "sever their ties with their old culture". or 1963,

By high school he had started "chronicling the family with a camera – first his mother's Kodak 620 and, then a 35mm Japanese camera he bought for £15". He moved to Dubbo when he was 14 to finish his high school at the Dubbo High School.

Career
Bishop began his career as a cadet photographer with The Sydney Morning Herald in 1962, the first Aboriginal photographer hired by the paper, becoming the first Aboriginal person to work on a metropolitan daily newspaper and one of the first to become a professional photographer. During four years of his cadetship, he completed a Photography Certificate Course at Sydney Technical College. In 2004, he remained the only indigenous photographer to have been employed by the paper.

He won the Nikon-Walkley Australian Press Photographer of the Year in 1971 with Life and Death Dash (1971).

From 1974 to 1980, he worked as the Department of Aboriginal Affairs staff photographer. Some of his most enduring work came from this period, as he visited Indigenous communities and documented "the first flush of an idealistic era when land rights, equal wages and government-funded aid seemed to presage a new dawn for Aboriginal Australians".

It was during this time, in 1975, that he shot the iconic photograph of Gough Whitlam pouring soil into the hand of Gurindji traditional owner, Vincent Lingiari, at the handover of the deeds to Gurindji country at Wattie Creek. This photograph has been seen as capturing "the symbolic birth of landrights".

He returned to the Herald in 1979, before becoming a freelance photographer in 1986, working for such agencies as the National Geographic Society.

Bishop completed further studies and lectured in photography at Tranby Aboriginal College, the Eora College and at the Tin Sheds Gallery at the University of Sydney.

In 1991 he had his first solo exhibition, In Dreams: Mervyn, Thirty Years of Photography 1960 to 1990, at the Australian Centre for Photography. Originally curated by Tracey Moffatt, it went on to tour for over 10 years. A book titled In Dreams was published to accompany the exhibition.

He produced a one-man performance piece, Flash Blak, in the vein of a William Yang slide show to music and written and directed by Yang, for the 2004 Message Sticks Festival at the Sydney Opera House. His aim in the show was to delve "into his family's history to illuminate a wider story about Aboriginal life in the latter half of the 20th century". He also worked as a stills photographer on Phillip Noyce's Rabbit-Proof Fence.

Exhibitions and collections
Bishop's work was included in Candid Camera: Australian Photography 1950s–1970s at the Art Gallery of South Australia (May to August 2010), a group retrospective of social documentary photography which also featured the work of key Australian photographers Max Dupain, David Moore, Jeff Carter, Robert McFarlane, Rennie Ellis, Carol Jerrems and Roger Scott.

A number of Bishop's photographs are held in the permanent collection of the Art Gallery of New South Wales and the National Gallery of Australia.

Awards
1971: He won the Nikon-Walkley Australian Press Photographer of the Year for Life and Death Dash, a photograph, which had appeared on the front page of the Herald in January 1971, depicting a nun rushing to get help for an Aboriginal child.
2000: He was awarded the Australia Council's $50,000 Red Ochre Award, through its Aboriginal and Torres Strait Islander Arts Board.

Other recognition
Bishop features in "Through the Eyes of Lens with Merv Bishop", an episode in the 2013 documentary television series Desperate Measures.

Personal life
His wife, Elizabeth, died of cancer in 1991, and he was left to care for their teenage son, Tim, and six-year-old daughter, Rosemary.

Solo and group exhibitions
 1991, In Dreams: Mervyn Bishop Thirty Years of Photography 1960–1990, Australian Centre for Photography, Sydney and touring
 1991, Images of Black Sport, Powerhouse Museum, Sydney
 1991, Her Story: Images of Domestic Labour in Australian Art, S.H. Ervin Gallery, Sydney
 1991, Fine and mostly sunny: photographs from the collection, Art Gallery of New South Wales, Sydney
 1992, Cultural exchange with the Chinese Photographic Society and Australia's Department of Foreign Affairs and Trade
 1992, Recent Acquisitions – Australian Photography, Art Gallery of New South Wales
 1993, Aratjara: Art of the First Australians, Touring: Kunstsammlung Nordrhein-Westfalen, Düsseldorf; Hayward Gallery, London; Louisiana Museum of Modern Art, Humlebaek
 1993, Urban Focus: Aboriginal and Torres Strait Islander Art from the Urban Areas of Australia, National Gallery of Australia, Canberra
 1993, Photographs from the collection, Art Gallery of New South Wales
 1994, Critic's choice, Art Gallery of New South Wales
 1994, We Are Family, Art Gallery of New South Wales
 1996, From the Street – Photographs From the Collection, Art Gallery of New South Wales
 1997, Discipline and beauty, Art Gallery of New South Wales
 1998, Retake: Contemporary Aboriginal and Torres Strait Islander Photography, National Gallery of Australia
 2000, Another country, Art Gallery of New South Wales
 2001, A Dubbo Day with Jimmy and other reconciliation images, Stills Gallery, Paddington
 2003, New View: Indigenous Photographic Perspectives, Monash Gallery
 2003, On the Beach: with Whiteley and fellow Australian artists, Brett Whiteley Studio, Surry Hills
 2004, Australian postwar photodocumentary, Art Gallery of New South Wales
 2008, Half Light: Portraits from Black Australia, Art Gallery of New South Wales
 2010, Candid Camera: Australian Photography 1950s–1970s, Art Gallery of South Australia, Adelaide
 2011, What's in a face? aspects of portrait photography, Art Gallery of New South Wales
 2012, Home: Aboriginal Art from NSW, Art Gallery of New South Wales
 2015, The photograph and Australia, Art Gallery of New South Wales
 2017, Mervyn Bishop (24 June – 8 October), Art Gallery of New South Wales
 2019, Artist talk and exhibition (7 May – 22 June), Bank Art Museum Moree, New South Wales.

References
Notes

Sources

External links
 Mervyn Bishop at the Art Gallery of New South Wales
 Interview with Mervyn Bishop on ABC Radio Darwin

Australian photographers
Indigenous Australian people
1945 births
Living people
Documentary photographers